The Zero one infinity (ZOI) rule is a rule of thumb in software design proposed by early computing pioneer Willem van der Poel. It argues that arbitrary limits on the number of instances of a particular type of data or structure should not be allowed. Instead, an entity should either be forbidden entirely, only one should be allowed, or any number of them should be allowed. Although various factors outside that particular software could limit this number in practice, it should not be the software itself that puts a hard limit on the number of instances of the entity.

Examples of this rule may be found in the structure of many file systems' directories (also known as folders): 
 0 – The topmost directory has zero parent directories; that is, there is no directory that contains the topmost directory.  
 1 – Each subdirectory has exactly one parent directory (not including shortcuts to the directory's location; while such files may have similar icons to the icons of the destination directories, they are not directories at all).  
 Infinity – Each directory, whether the topmost directory or any of its subdirectories, according to the file system's rules, may contain any number of files or subdirectories. Practical limits to this number are caused by other factors, such as space available on storage media and how well the computer's operating system is maintained.

In real-world software design, violations of this rule of thumb are common. For example, the FAT16 file system imposes a limit of 65,536 files to a directory.

Authorship

Van der Poel confirmed that he was the originator of the rule, but Bruce MacLennan has also claimed authorship (in the form "The only reasonable numbers are zero, one and infinity."), writing in 2015 that:

References

See also 
 Magic number (programming)#Unnamed numerical constants

Software engineering folklore
Programming principles